FERC v. Electric Power Supply Ass'n, 577 U.S. ___ (2016), was a case in which the Supreme Court of the United States held that the Federal Energy Regulatory Commission had the authority to regulate demand response transactions. Justice Scalia's dissenting opinion in this case was the last opinion he wrote before his death in February 2016.

Background
Under the Federal Power Act, the Federal Energy Regulatory Commission (FERC) is allowed to regulate “the sale of electric energy at wholesale in inter state commerce", including any activities that affect the wholesale price of electricity. This case involved a dispute about FERC's attempts to regulate a practice called "demand response". In demand response transactions, wholesale electricity suppliers pay consumers to use less electricity during periods in which electricity is in high demand. In certain circumstances, FERC required suppliers to pay conserving consumers the same price that they would pay electricity producers for generating electricity. A group of electricity suppliers challenged FERC's regulation in court; they claimed that FERC lacked authority to regulate demand response transactions and that even if they did have the power to do so, FERC failed to justify why demand response providers and electricity producers should receive the same compensation.

Opinion of the Court
Writing for a majority of the Court, Justice Elena Kagan ruled that FERC possessed the "requisite statutory power" to regulate demand response transactions and that FERC adequately justified why demand response providers and electricity producers should receive the same compensation. Justice Antonin Scalia wrote a dissenting opinion in which he argued that FERC did not have authority to regulate demand response transactions. This was the last dissenting opinion written by Justice Scalia before his death in February 2016, though his last majority opinion was in Kansas v. Carr.

See also
 List of United States Supreme Court cases
 Lists of United States Supreme Court cases by volume
 List of United States Supreme Court cases by the Roberts Court

References

External links
 

United States Supreme Court cases
United States Supreme Court cases of the Roberts Court
2016 in United States case law
Demand response
Electric power in the United States